Zandré Jordaan (born 24 September 1987) is a South African rugby union player for  in the Currie Cup and in the Rugby Challenge. His regular position is a loose-forward.

Career

Youth

He also played for their Under-19 side in 2006 and their Under-21 side in 2008.

Senior career

In 2009, Jordaan was included in their squad for the 2009 Vodacom Cup competition.

For the latter half of 2009, Jordaan joined  for the 2009 Currie Cup Premier Division. He has since established himself as a first-team regular for Boland, playing in the majority of games since then.

In 2012, Jordaan was included in a South African Barbarians (South) team that faced England during the 2012 mid-year rugby test series. The following year, he was included in a South Africa President's XV team that played in the 2013 IRB Tbilisi Cup and won the tournament after winning all three matches.

References

South African rugby union players
Living people
1987 births
People from Empangeni
Western Province (rugby union) players
Boland Cavaliers players
Stellenbosch University alumni
SWD Eagles players
Griquas (rugby union) players
Rugby union flankers
Rugby union players from KwaZulu-Natal